The Women's 100 metre butterfly competition at the 2019 World Championships was held on 21 and 22 July 2019.

Records
Prior to the competition, the existing world and championship records were as follows.

Results

Heats
The heats were held on 21 July at 10:45.

Semifinals
The semifinals were held on 21 July at 20:12.

Semifinal 1

Semifinal 2

Final
The final was held on 22 July at 20:10.

References

Women's 100 metre butterfly
2019 in women's swimming